Yangyu may refer to:

Yangyu, Shaanxi (阳峪), a town in Qian County, Shaanxi, China
Yangyu Township (阳隅乡), a township in Wenxi County, Shanxi, China

See also
Yang Yu (disambiguation)